Dendropsophus mathiassoni, or Mathiasson's treefrog, is a species of frog in the family Hylidae that is endemic to Colombia.
Its natural habitats are moist savanna, subtropical or tropical moist shrubland, freshwater marshes, intermittent freshwater marshes, pastureland, rural gardens, ponds, irrigated land, seasonally flooded agricultural land, and canals and ditches.

References

mathiassoni
Amphibians of Colombia
Amphibians described in 1970
Taxonomy articles created by Polbot